Malcolm Wild (4 October 1931 – 10 July 2011) was an Australian football (soccer) player, who represented Australia in two full international matches. He has since been designated as  Socceroo #126.

Career

Club and state career

Wild debuted in the first grade team for his club Brisbane in 1948. During 1957 he played for Eastern Suburbs F.C. In 1959 Wild was the captain of Annerley Football Club, winning both the premiership and championship in the Brisbane League.

He was selected in 1950 to represent the Queensland state team against New South Wales. Wild made 20 appearances for Queensland between 1950 and 1960.

International career

Wild made his international debut in a friendly game against New Zealand in Melbourne on 14 August 1954. His other appearance for the national team was on 28 August 1954, also against New Zealand, in Brisbane.

References

1939 births
2011 deaths
Australian soccer players
Australia international soccer players
Association football forwards